Richard Lee Rhodes (born July 4, 1937) is an American historian, journalist, and author of both fiction and non-fiction, including the Pulitzer Prize-winning The Making of the Atomic Bomb (1986), and most recently, Energy: A Human History (2018).

Rhodes has been awarded grants from the Ford Foundation, the Guggenheim Foundation, the MacArthur Foundation, and the Alfred P. Sloan Foundation among others. Rhodes is an affiliate of the Center for International Security and Cooperation at Stanford University. He also frequently gives lectures and talks on a broad range of subjects, including testimony to the U.S. Senate on nuclear energy.

Biography
Richard Rhodes was born in Kansas City, Kansas, in 1937. Following his mother's suicide on July 25, 1938, Rhodes and his older brother Stanley were raised in the Kansas City, Missouri, area by his father, a railroad boilermaker with a third-grade education. When Rhodes was ten, their father remarried.  The new wife starved, exploited, and abused the children. One day Stanley walked into a police station and reported their living conditions.

The brothers were removed from their father's custody and sent to the Andrew Drumm Institute, an institution for boys founded in 1928 in Independence, Missouri. The admission of the brothers was something of an anomaly as the institution was designed for orphaned or indigent boys and they fit neither category. The Drumm Institute is still in operation today, and now accepts both boys and girls. Rhodes became a member of the board of trustees in 1991. Rhodes wrote about his childhood in A Hole in the World.

Richard and Stanley lived at Drumm for the remainder of their adolescence. Both graduated from high school. Rhodes was admitted to Yale University with a full scholarship and graduated with honors in 1959, a member of Manuscript Society.

Rhodes has published 23 books as well as numerous articles for national magazines, and wrote a play that is based on the historic  1986 meeting between Ronald Reagan and Mikhail Gorbachev. His best-known work, The Making of the Atomic Bomb, was published in 1986 and earned him the Pulitzer Prize and numerous other awards. Many of his personal documents and research materials are part of the Kansas Collection at the Spencer Research Library, University of Kansas.

Rhodes is the father of two children and is a grandfather. He and his second wife, Ginger Rhodes, have made their home in California.

Nuclear history
Rhodes came to national prominence with his 1986 book, The Making of the Atomic Bomb, a narrative of the history of the people and events during World War II from the discoveries leading to the science of nuclear fission in the 1930s, through the Manhattan Project and the atomic bombings of Hiroshima and Nagasaki. Among its many honors, the 900-page book won the Pulitzer Prize for General Non-Fiction, the National Book Award for Nonfiction, and a National Book Critics Circle Award, and has sold hundreds of thousands of copies in English alone, as well as having been translated into a dozen or so other languages.

Praised by both historians and former Los Alamos weapon engineers and scientists alike, the book is considered a general authority on early nuclear weapons history, as well as the development of modern physics in general, during the first half of the 20th century. According to a citation on the first page of the book, Nobel Laureate Isidor Rabi, one of the prime participants in the dawn of the atomic age, said about the book, "An epic worthy of Milton. Nowhere else have I seen the whole story put down with such elegance and gusto and in such revealing detail and simple language which carries the reader through wonderful and profound scientific discoveries and their application." In 2012 the book was reissued as a 25th anniversary edition with a new foreword by Rhodes.

In 1992, Rhodes followed it up by compiling, editing, and writing the introduction to an annotated version of The Los Alamos Primer, by Manhattan Project scientist Robert Serber. The Primer was a set of lectures given to new arrivals at the secret Los Alamos Laboratory during wartime to get them up to speed about the prominent questions needing to be solved in bomb design, and had been largely declassified in 1965, but was not widely available.
 
In 1993, Rhodes published Nuclear Renewal: Common Sense about Energy detailing the history of the nuclear power industry in the United States, and future promises of nuclear power.

Rhodes published a sequel to The Making of the Atomic Bomb in 1995, Dark Sun: The Making of the Hydrogen Bomb, which told the story of the atomic espionage during World War II (Klaus Fuchs, Julius and Ethel Rosenberg, among others), the debates over whether the hydrogen bomb ought to be produced (see History of nuclear weapons), and the eventual creation of the bomb and its consequences for the arms race.

In 1997 Rhodes appeared in the UK Channel 4 TV series Equinox episode "A Very British Bomb" about the UK's efforts after the war to develop its own nuclear weapons after collaboration with the US had been halted by the 1946 MacMahon Act.

In 2007, Rhodes published Arsenals of Folly: The Making of the Nuclear Arms Race, a chronicle of the arms buildups during the Cold War, especially focusing on Mikhail Gorbachev and the Reagan administration.

The Twilight of the Bombs, the fourth and final volume in his series on nuclear history, was published in 2010. The book documents, among other topics, the post-Cold War nuclear history of the world, nuclear proliferation, and nuclear terrorism.

Other prominent works
 
John James Audubon, published in 2004, is a biography of the French-born American artist, John James Audubon (1785–1851). Audubon is known for his life-sized watercolor illustrations of birds and wildlife, including The Birds of America, a multi-volume work published through subscriptions in the mid-19th century, first in England and then in the United States. Rhodes also edited a collection of Audubon's letters and writings published by Everyman's Library (Alfred A. Knopf, 2006)—The Audubon Reader.

Rhodes' 1997 book Deadly Feasts is a work of verity concerning transmissible spongiform encephalopathies (TSE), prions, and the career of Daniel Carleton Gajdusek. It reviews the history of TSE epidemics, beginning with the infection of large numbers of the Fore people of the New Guinea Eastern Highlands during a period when they consumed their dead in mortuary feasts, and explores the link between new variant Creutzfeldt–Jakob disease (nvCJD) in humans and the consumption of beef contaminated with bovine spongiform encephalopathy, commonly referred to as mad cow disease.

Hedy's Folly was published in November 2011 and deals with the life and work of the Hollywood actress and inventor Hedy Lamarr.

Rhodes book Hell and Good Company, published in 2015, is about the Spanish Civil War and the changes that came from it.

Though less well known as a writer of fiction, Rhodes is also the author of four novels. Three of the four are currently out of print, but The Ungodly: A Novel of the Donner Party, his first, was reissued in a new edition in 2007 by Stanford University Press.

Science-Based Medicine writer Steven Novella says that Rhodes's book from 2018 Energy: A Human History reviews the history of our use of energy from around 1500 to the present. Novella writes, "it is well-researched and contains a wealth of historical information... A few themes stuck out for me in the book. One was how similar the social, political, and market forces are today and in the past when it comes to energy" and "the book is timely because the history of our energy decisions in the past is great background for our energy decisions today from his 2018 review."

Bibliography
 

As editor

References

External links
Official Site

In Depth interview with Rhodes, March 5, 2000
Video of interview/discussion with Richard Rhodes and Joseph Cirincione on Bloggingheads.tv
2013 Video Interview with Richard Rhodes by Cynthia C. Kelly Voices of the Manhattan Project

1937 births
American male journalists
American memoirists
Living people
National Book Award winners
Historians of nuclear weapons
Writers from Kansas City, Kansas
Pulitzer Prize for General Non-Fiction winners
Journalists from Kansas
Writers from Kansas
Historians from Missouri
20th-century American historians
21st-century American historians
21st-century American male writers
20th-century American male writers
Journalists from Missouri
Historians from California
Journalists from California
American male non-fiction writers